Komagome may refer to:
Komagome River, a river in Japan
Komagome Station, a railway station in Toshima, Tokyo, Japan